Barndarrig is a village in County Wicklow, Ireland. It is located just off the N11 road.

Public transport
The village is served by a bus stop on the N11 road. It is served daily in each direction by several (but not all) coaches on Bus Éireann's Expressway route 2 (Wexford-Arklow-Dublin-Dublin Airport). It is also served albeit infrequently by Bus Éireann route 384. The nearest railway station is Wicklow railway station.

Until the end of September 2012 Bus Éireann route 2 used to stop at Ballincor numerous times each day. From then this changed, resulting in considerable public dissatisfaction with the decision - as the bus provided a useful link to hospitals as well as for commuting and other purposes. The stop was reinstated in the route 2 timetable from 25 August 2013.

References

See also
 List of towns and villages in Ireland

Towns and villages in County Wicklow